C98 or C-98 may refer to:

 C-98 Clipper, the military designation of the Boeing 314 flying boat
 CJYC-FM, "Big John FM", formerly known as "C98"
 Cray C98, a model of the Cray C90
 Ruy Lopez (ECO code), a chess opening
 Lake Village Airport (FAA LID), Indiana, US
 Right to Organise and Collective Bargaining Convention, 1949 (ILO code)